Alto Madness is an album by alto saxophonists Jackie McLean and John Jenkins recorded in 1957 and released on the Prestige label. The rhythm section is pianist Wade Legge, bassist Doug Watkins and drummer Art Taylor.

Reception

In an AllMusic review by Scott Yanow, he stated: "McLean became much more individual within a few years, while Jenkins would fade from the scene altogether. This likable jam session features plenty of tradeoffs by the two altoists".

Track listing 
All compositions by John Jenkins, except where indicated.
 "Alto Madness" (Jackie McLean) – 11:48  
 "Windy City" – 6:59  
 "The Lady Is a Tramp" (Lorenz Hart, Richard Rodgers) – 6:49  
 "Easy Living" (Ralph Rainger, Leo Robin) – 7:35  
 "Pondering" – 6:15

Personnel 
Jackie McLean, John Jenkins – alto saxophone
Wade Legge – piano
Doug Watkins – bass
Art Taylor – drums

Production
Bob Weinstock – supervisor
Rudy Van Gelder – engineer

References 

Jackie McLean albums
John Jenkins (jazz musician) albums
1957 albums
Prestige Records albums
Albums produced by Bob Weinstock
Albums recorded at Van Gelder Studio